Poenit may refer to:
Poenitentiaria or Apostolic Penitentiary
Phut